The 1er Batallón de Combate-Grupo Especial Uno (1st Combat Battalion-Special Group One, GE-1) is a tactical assault division of the Argentine Federal Police. It depends directly of the Infantry Guard Corps, and its motto is Nihil Obstat (Nothing Hinders).

The unit was established under the denomination of Special Combat Teams in 1978, when Argentina hosted the Football World Cup. Ten years later, in 1988, the division changed its name to Police Operations Group and officially became the premier counterterrorism team of the Federal Police. In 1994 the GEOF was created and the GE-1 dramatically reduced its size, although some elements remained still functional. The Superintendent of Metropolitan Security re-activated the unit in 2002. The group quickly became an elite tactical force, with more than 400 successful tactical interventions.

All GE-1 officers must pass a rigorous, extensive training course before he/she apply to join. It is important to know that all active personnel remains in their original unit and are called when needed, a selective style similar to many American SWAT groups. The division constantly trains with similar Argentine and foreign special units.

The group uses specialized weapons and gear such as the Glock 17 9mm pistol, Heckler & Koch HK33 assault rifles, Heckler & Koch MP5 submachine gun, and the M24 SWS sniper rifle.

See also
 Scorpion Group
 Albatross Group
 Federal Special Operations Group
 Hawk Special Operations Brigade
 Argentine Federal Police

Federal law enforcement agencies of Argentina
Non-military counterterrorist organizations